Sene West is one of the constituencies represented in the Parliament of Ghana. It was created before the 2012 Ghanaian general election. It elects one Member of Parliament (MP) by the first past the post system of election. Sene West is located in the Bono East Region of Ghana. It was formed from the Sene constituency which at its inception in 1992, was a constituency in the defunct Brong Ahafo Region. Sene constituency was split into Sene East and Sene West in 2012. The Brong Ahafo Region was also spit into three, Bono, Ahafo and Bono East region. Sene West is now in Bono East.

Boundaries 
The seat is located within the Sene District of the Bono East Region of Ghana.

Members of Parliament

Elections

See also 
 List of Ghana Parliament constituencies
 List of political parties in Ghana

References 

Parliamentary constituencies in the Bono East Region